Chaméane (Auvergnat: Chameana) is a former commune in the Puy-de-Dôme department in Auvergne-Rhône-Alpes in central France. It is in the canton of Brassac-les-Mines. On 1 January 2019, it was merged into the new commune Le Vernet-Chaméane.

See also
Communes of the Puy-de-Dôme department

References

Former communes of Puy-de-Dôme